Barbora Krejčíková and Aleksandra Krunić were the defending champions, but Krunić chose not to participate. Krejčíková partnered Katarzyna Piter, but lost in the quarterfinals to Tatiana Búa and Georgina García Pérez.

Kiki Bertens and Richèl Hogenkamp won the title, defeating Cornelia Lister and Jeļena Ostapenko in the final, 7–6(7–2), 6–4.

Seeds

Draw

References 
 Draw

2015 ITF Women's Circuit
WSG Open